Rizen may refer to:

 Rizen (gospel group), an American gospel group
 The Rizen, a 2017 British horror film
 Eric Lynch (born 1978), nickname Rizen, American professional poker player
 Clotiazepam, trade name Rizen, a drug

See also
Risen (disambiguation)
Ryzen